Pierre Flotte or Pierre Flote (Languedoc, second half of the 13th century – Kortrijk, 11 July 1302) was a French legalist, Chancellor of France and Keeper of the Seals of Philip IV the Fair. 
He was taught Roman law at the University of Montpellier, and was considered one of the best lawyers and legalists of his time. He led negotiations with the Roman Curia, England and Germany.

He was an adversary of Pope Boniface VIII, defending the authoritarianism of the French king against the Roman Church, and the first civilian to be appointed as Chancellor, as before, only ecclesiastics were granted this honor.

He died in the Battle of the Golden Spurs which took place near Kortrijk on 11 July 1302, when the local Flemish population mounted a successful uprising against France.

Flote, Pierre
Flote, Pierre
Flote, Pierre
Year of birth unknown